Annabel Jane Elizabeth Karmel  (born 10 May 1957) is the author of books on nutrition and cooking for babies, children and families.

Early life 
Annabel Karmel was born on 10 May 1957.  

Prior to her career in infant nutrition she was a talented musician, under the name Annabel Etkind.

Her first book was  The Complete Baby and Toddler Meal Planner, published in 1991. Karmel has since published 37 books on feeding babies, toddlers and families as well as eating in pregnancy and books on cooking with children.

Newspapers and magazines
Karmel writes regularly for national newspapers and also contributes to Practical Parenting & Pregnancy,  Prima Baby, BBC Good Food, Surrey, Hampshire and Tesco's Baby Club. She appears frequently on radio and television, and completed a series on the Richard & Judy Show as the Foodie Godmother, where she travelled around the country solving the problems of fussy eaters. She also filmed a 10-part series with Sky Active called  Mummy That's Yummy. In 2011 Karmel aired her TV show Annabel's Kitchen, commissioned for CITV, with major sponsors being Fairy Liquid and Procter and Gamble. 

Karmel's iPhone app Annabel's Essential Guide to Feeding your Baby and Toddler features 120 recipes and episodes from TV series Annabel's Kitchen. Karmel also works with NUK making a range of feeding equipment for making baby food.

Food
Karmel has a popular range of food products for toddlers and babies. In 2007, Karmel launched a range of chilled ready meals for toddlers, she also has a range of ambient and organic sauces and pastas as well as teaming up with Disney to make a range of healthy snacks. Her food products are stocked in all major UK supermarkets. Karmel also has her menus in some of the largest restaurant chains; leisure parks and nurseries in the UK, serving up more than one million children's meals each year.

Karmel is a patron for the charity Julia's House, a hospice dedicated to children with life limiting conditions. She worked closely with CLIC Sargent's 'The Great Mums Get Together' campaign in 2013.

Awards
Karmel was awarded an MBE in June 2006 in the Queen's Birthday Honours for her work in the field of child nutrition.
In 2009, Karmel won the Lifetime Achievement Award at the Mother and Baby Awards.

Bibliography
 Karmel, Annabel (20 August 2019). Real Food Kids Will Love: Over 100 Simple and Delicious Recipes for Toddlers and Up. St. Martin's Press. . 
Karmel, Annabel (25 May 2017). Annabel Karmel's Baby-Led Weaning Recipe Book: 120 Recipes to Let Your Baby Take the Lead. Palazzo Editions. .

References

External links 
 Official site

British food writers
Living people
1957 births
Members of the Order of the British Empire